Roman Brumm (March 5, 1898 – September 2, 1981) was a player in the National Football League. He first played with the Racine Legion during the 1924 NFL season. The following season, he played with the Milwaukee Badgers before returning to Racine, by then renamed the Tornadoes, for the 1926 NFL season.

References

1898 births
1981 deaths
American football ends
Sportspeople from Madison, Wisconsin
Players of American football from Wisconsin
Racine Legion players
Milwaukee Badgers players
Racine Tornadoes players
University of Wisconsin–Eau Claire alumni
Wisconsin–La Crosse Eagles football players
Wisconsin Badgers football players
Wisconsin–Eau Claire Blugolds football players